Canada's Sports Hall of Fame (sometimes referred to as the Canadian Sports Hall of Fame) is a Canadian sports hall of fame and museum in Calgary, Alberta, Canada. Dedicated to the history of sports in Canada, it serves as a hall of fame and museum for accomplished Canadian athletes, and sports builders and officials.

Established in 1955, the organization inducted its first class of hall of famers, and opened a museum to the public that year. The museum was originally located at Exhibition Place in Toronto. In 1957, the hall of fame moved to another facility at Exhibition Place, sharing the space with the Hockey Hall of Fame. A new building to house the two halls of fame was later built at Exhibition Place in 1961. The two halls of fame continued to share facilities until 1993, when the Hockey Hall of Fame moved to a different location. Canada's Sports Hall of Fame became the building's sole occupant until it was closed in 2006 to make way for BMO Field. The organization continued to induct honourees to its hall of fame, although a new facility to house its museum was not completed until 2011. The  facility was opened at Canada Olympic Park in Calgary, and houses the organization's offices and hall of fame museum.

As of 2022, there were 668 inductees into Canada's Sports Hall of Fame, categorized either as athletes, or as builders of the sport. Inductees are nominated by the Canadian public, though are ultimately selected by the organization's selection committee. In addition to inductions into its hall of fame, the organization has also conferred awards for accomplishments in sport, and in the larger community.

History

Efforts to create a national sports hall of fame were spurred by Harry Price, the chairman of the sports committee of the Canadian National Exhibition, who began to travel across Canada in 1947 to gather support for a museum and hall of fame. The hall of fame museum was formally opened on 24 August 1955, at Stanley Barracks in Exhibition Place, Toronto. In 1957, the hall of fame was relocated to the Press Building in Exhibition Place, sharing the facilities with the Hockey Hall of Fame.

After the Hockey Hall of Fame announced it would build a new museum and hall of fame building at Exhibition Place in 1958, it extended an invitation to Canada's Sports Hall of Fame to move into its new facility. The Hall of Fame building was officially opened on 1 May 1961, with Canada's Sports Hall of Fame, and the Hockey Hall of Fame as its occupants. Canada's Hall of Fame would share the same building with the Hockey Hall of Fame until 1993, when the Hockey Hall of Fame moved into Brookfield Place in downtown Toronto. The Hockey Hall of Fames' move to downtown Toronto led to a decline in attendance at Canada's Sports Hall of Fame in the late 1990s, resulting in plans to move sports hall of fame to Ottawa. However, the federal government cancelled those plans in 1999.

Canada's Sports Hall of Fame closed its museum to the public in 2006, with the building demolished to make way for BMO Field. The organization placed its collections in storage at Stanley Barracks, until a new facility to house the museum was completed. In 2008, the hall of fame's board of governors announced a national bid for a new permanent location for the museum. Nine cities submitted bids to host the museum, although the city of Calgary was eventually selected. Constructed at Canada Olympic Park, funding was provided by the federal government, provincial, and municipal government; in addition to private funds. The federal government contributed C$15 million to the construction budget, whereas the provincial government contributed C$10 million, and the municipal government contributing C$5 million. Canada's Sports Hall of Fame was tasked with raising an additional C$20 million to help pay operational expenses. The building opened to the public on 1 July 2011.

In 2019, the hall of fame introduced the People's Choice Award, to recognize an individual sport champion who also contributes to charities and local communities. The inaugural winner of the award was champion golfer and 9-time winner on the LPGA Tour, Brooke Henderson. In the same year, the organization also introduced the Order of Sport Award, which served as a physical award for being inductee to the hall of fame.

Building

The  hall of fame and museum building is located Canada Olympic Road, at Canada Olympic Park, a ski hill and multi-purpose training and competition facility in Calgary. The museum was formerly located at Exhibition Place in Toronto, before it relocated to a new permanent facility in Calgary.

Completed in 2011, Canada's Hall of Fame building was designed by Stantec, on behalf of CANA Construction, the project manager and design-lead for the museum. The exterior facade with its cantilevered structure, was designed to mimic the elevated platforms where athletes receive their medals. The building colour of red and white was taken from the colours of the flag of Canada. The structure was designed to be a sustainable building, and received LEED Silver certification.

The interior of the building is made of three components, the museum and exhibition halls, the organization's office space, and storage space for the museum's collections. All components of the building are connected through a -storey atrium.

Museum
The museum and exhibit hall was purposely designed on the upper level of the building, with the upper level having more floor area than the floor below it. The cantilevered area also holds exhibits on individual sports. 

The museum space features twelve galleries, a theatre, and interactive exhibits on the hall of fame's inductees, and Canadian sport. The museum's twelve themed galleries located on various levels, are separated by a "series of bays". The exhibits are designed to circulate around the museum's central atrium or the "Grand Hall," which houses six national trophy exhibits. The design of the museum exhibits was done by Cambridge Seven Associates.

The museum's collections includes over 60,000 photographs, and 100,000 artifacts.

Inductees

As of November 2019, Canada's Sports Hall of Fame had over 670 inductees, categorized either as athletes or builders of the sport. Beginning with the induction of the 2019 class of hall of famers, Canada's Sports Hall of Fame began to issue the Order of Sport award to inductees, as a physical token of their induction into the hall of fame. Hall of famers that were inducted prior to 2019 were all retroactively made "peers" of the order, upon its creation.

Nominations for inductees are accepted from the Canadian public throughout the year. Athletes nominated are required to have been retired for at least four years, although builders may be nominated when they are still active in their careers. Animals and inanimate objects may be considered for induction, although their nomination requires the approval of the Hall's Board of Governors.

A new group of inductees has been introduced into Canada's Hall of Fame annually since its inception in 1955. The annual election of nominees is chosen through a selection committee of ten to 16 people.

Canadian sport legends class
On June 17, 2015, the Hall of Fame introduced the Sport Legends class of inductees, made up of athletes whose careers occurred before 1955. The creation of the Sport Legend class was undertaken in commemoration of the 150th anniversary of Canada.

Athletes

 George Burleigh
 William Cecil Billy Christmas
 Alex Decoteau
 Carol Ann Duthie
 Alfred Cam Ecclestone
 Larry Gains
 Bob Goldham
 Gerald Gratton
 Robina Higgins Haight
 Barbara Howard
 Bill Isaacs
 Joe Keeper
 Johnny Loaring
 Harry Xul-si-malt Manson 
 Vincent McIntyre
 Robert McLeod
 Aileen Meagher
 Albert Murray
 Charles Murray
 Alf Philips 
 Robert Pirie
 Robert Powell
 Harvey Pulford 
 Robert Scotty Rankine
 Hilda Ranscombe
 Eileen Whalley Richards
 Winnie Roach-Leuszler
 Mary Rose Thacker
 Elizabeth Whittall
 Rhona and Rhoda Wurtele

Builders

 Earl Bascom
 Frank Calder
 James Creighton
 Norton Crow 
 Sidney Dawes
 Jan Eisenhardt
 Alexandrine Gibb
 Cecil Grenier 
 Phyllis Griffiths
 Frederick James Heather 
 Frank Read
 Melville Marks "Bobby" Robinson
 William Shuttleworth
 Henry Sotvedt
 Stanley Thompson

See also

 Alberta Sports Hall of Fame
 BC Sports Hall of Fame
 Manitoba Sports Hall of Fame and Museum
 New Brunswick Sports Hall of Fame
 Nova Scotia Sport Hall of Fame
 Ontario Sports Hall of Fame

References

Further reading

External links

 

1955 establishments in Alberta
All-sports halls of fame
Awards established in 1955
Canadian sports trophies and awards
Halls of fame in Canada
Museums in Calgary
Sport in Calgary
Sports museums in Canada